Russell Ellen (born 8 February 1954) is a former Australian rules footballer who played with Essendon in the Victorian Football League (VFL). Ellen later played for West Perth in the West Australian Football League (WAFL), Wembley in the Western Australian Amateur Football League, his old team Marnoo in the Lexton Football League, South Broken Hill in the Broken Hill Football League, and finally in Perth's Sunday Football League.

Notes

External links 
		

Essendon Football Club past player profile
WAFL statistics		

Living people
1954 births
Australian rules footballers from Victoria (Australia)
Essendon Football Club players
West Perth Football Club players
South Broken Hill Football Club players